Silver Moon may refer to:

 Silver Moon (album), a 2012 album by Donkeyboy
 "Silver Moon" (Michael Nesmith song), 1970
 "Silver Moon" (David Sylvian song), 1986
 Silver Moon Bookshop, a defunct feminist bookshop in London
 Silver Moon (ship), a cruise ship operated by Silversea Cruises
 Silvermoon Drive-in, a drive-in theatre in Lakeland, Florida
 Silvermoon, a community in Thames Centre, Ontario, Canada

See also
 Silver moony, a tropical fish